Bayezid (also spelled Beyazıt, Beyazid, Bayazid, Bajazet, Beyazit, Bejazid or Bayazit), an Arabic, Persian, and Turkish name, from the Arabic , meaning "a devoted saint", may refer to:

People
 Bayezid I (1360–1403), Sultan of the Ottoman Empire from 1389 to 1402
 Bayezid II (1447–1512), Sultan of the Ottoman Empire from 1481 to 1512
 Bayazid Pir Roshan (b. 1525), a Pashtun warrior-poet and freedom fighter
 Şehzade Bayezid (1525–1561), son of Sultan Suleiman I of the Ottoman Empire and his wife Hürrem Sultan
 Bayazid Bastami (804–874 or 877/78), Persian Sufi
 Bayazid (Jalayirids), Shaikh Bayazid Jalayir, Jalayirid Prince and governor of Soltaniyeh from 1382 to 1384

Places
Bayezid II Mosque (disambiguation)
Beyazıt Square, a district on the European side of Istanbul
Beyazıt Tower
Doğubeyazıt ("East Beyazıt" in Turkish), a city and district of Ağrı Province, Turkey
Gavar (Novo-Bayazet/"New Beyazit"), a town in Armenia

Other uses
Bajazet (play), a 1672 play by Jean Racine
Bajazet, a 1719 opera by Francesco Gasparini 
Bajazet (opera), a 1735 opera by Antonio Vivaldi

See also
Yazid (disambiguation)

Turkish masculine given names